Addison station may refer to:

Addison station (CTA Blue Line), a rapid transit station in Chicago, Illinois
Addison station (CTA Brown Line), an "L" station in Chicago, Illinois
Addison station (CTA Red Line), an "L" station in Chicago, Illinois
Addison Road station, a Washington Metro station in Prince George's County, Maryland
Addison Road railway station (England), now Kensington (Olympia) station, an Underground and Overground station in London, England
Addison Transit Center, a bus station in Addison, Texas